Metal was an Argentine heavy metal music magazine edited from 1984 to 1995. 

It was published by Magendra, which also published the Pelo magazine, devoted to mainstream rock and pop. 
Metal was the first heavy metal magazine published in Argentina.

The initial interviews were taken from foreign magazines, but years later they got their own ones with correspondents, or by telephone interviews. 
The magazine started as a black & white publication with a few pages in color. More color pages were included as years went by.

Metal also released an LP/cassette compilation in 1990 with songs of Argentine bands of the time: Pappo & Widowmaker, Horcas, Lethal, El Dragón, JAF, Hermética, Kamikaze, Alakrán, Tarzen, 2112, and El Reloj.

Another heavy metal music magazine published since 1989, Madhouse, had a greater success. 
Metal was discontinued in 1995.

References

1984 establishments in Argentina
1995 disestablishments in Argentina
Argentine heavy metal
Defunct magazines published in Argentina
Heavy metal publications
Magazines established in 1984
Magazines disestablished in 1995
Magazines published in Buenos Aires
Monthly magazines published in Argentina
Spanish-language magazines